William Louis Garrison (1924–2015) was an American geographer, transportation analyst and professor at the University of California, Berkeley. While at the Department of Geography, University of Washington in the 1950s, Garrison led the "quantitative revolution" in geography, which applied computers and statistics to the study of spatial problems. As such, he was one of the founders of regional science. Many of his students (dubbed the "space cadets") went on to become noted professors themselves, including: Brian Berry, Ronald Boyce, Duane Marble, Richard Morrill, John Nystuen, William Bunge, Michael Dacey, Arthur Getis, and Waldo Tobler.  His transportation work focused on innovation, the deployment of modes and logistic curves,  alternative vehicles and the future of the car.

Books by Garrison 
 Studies of Highway Development and Geographic Change (with Brian Berry, Duane Marble, John Nystuen, and Richard Morrill)   Greenwood Press, New York. (1959)
 Tomorrow's Transportation: Changing Cities, Economies, and Lives (with Jerry Ward) , 2000
 The Transportation Experience: Policy, Planning, and Deployment (with David M. Levinson) , 2005
 The Transportation Experience: Policy, Planning, and Deployment (with David M. Levinson) (Revised, re-organized, and expanded version of 2005 volume). Oxford and New York: Oxford University Press. , 2014

Important papers 
 Berry, B.. and Garrison, W. L. 1958: "The functional bases of the central place hierarchy". Economic Geography 34, 145 – 54.

External links 
 William L. Garrison Award for Best Dissertation in Computational Geography (biennial award for innovative research into the computational aspects of geographic science) 
 CUTC Award for Distinguished Contribution to University Transportation Education and Research 1998 (includes brief autobiographical sketch)
 Edward L. Ullman Award 1994
 William L. Garrison died

References 
 Barnes, Trevor J. "Placing ideas: genius loci, heterotopia and geography’s quantitative revolution" Progress in Human Geography 28,5 (2004) pp. 1 – 31 

Garrison, William Louis
Garrison, William Louis
Regional scientists
UC Berkeley College of Engineering faculty
1924 births
2015 deaths
University of Washington faculty